Muchacha (Spanish for 'young woman', or 'girl') may refer to:

Films and television
 La Muchacha del arrabal, a 1922 Argentine silent film
 La Muchacha del circo, a 1937 Argentine film
 Muchachas que estudian, a 1939 Argentine film
 Muchachas de Uniforme, a 1951 Mexican film
 La Muchacha del cuerpo de oro, a 1967 Argentine film
 Muchacha italiana viene a casarse (1971 TV series), a 1971 Mexican telenovela
 Una muchacha llamada Milagros, a 1974 Venezuelan telenovela
 Muchacha de barrio, a 1979 Mexican telenovela
 Muchacha italiana viene a casarse (2014 TV series), a 2014 Mexican telenovela

Music
 "Muchacha Triste", a 1993 song by Venezuelan group Los Fantasmas del Caribe
 "Muchacha" (song), a 2020 song by Cuban band Gente de Zona and American singer Becky G

See also
 
 
 La muchacha que limpia  (disambiguation)
 Muchacho (disambiguation)